Lincheng railway station is a station on Beijing–Guangzhou railway in Lincheng County, Xingtai, Hebei.

History
The station was opened in 1903.

From 28 June 2016, passenger train services at this station resumed.

References

Railway stations in Hebei
Stations on the Beijing–Guangzhou Railway
Railway stations in China opened in 1903